Robert William Weir Carrall (February 2, 1837 – September 19, 1879) was a Canadian physician and politician

Born in Carrall's Grove, near Woodstock, Upper Canada, the son of James and Jane Carrall, Carrall received his MD from McGill University in 1859. He practiced in Canada for a bit before becoming an assistant surgeon for the Union Army during the American Civil War working in Emory and Henry College Hospital (1862 to 1863) and at the Marine United States General Hospital at New Orleans (1863 to 1865).

In 1865, he moved to Nanaimo, British Columbia, where he worked as a doctor. In 1867, he moved to Barkerville where he also invested in mines. A supporter of confederation, he was elected to the Legislative Council of British Columbia in 1868 and served until 1871. From 1870 to 1871, he was a member of the Executive Council. He was one of three delegates who went to Ottawa to talk about the terms of British Columbia joining Canada. In 1871, he was summoned to the Senate of Canada. In 1879, he introduced a bill to make July 1 a public holiday to be called Dominion Day (now called Canada Day), which was later passed. He served until his death.

Carrall Street in Vancouver, British Columbia is named in his honour.

References

Further reading

External links

1837 births
1879 deaths
Canadian military doctors
Canadian senators from British Columbia
Conservative Party of Canada (1867–1942) senators
McGill University Faculty of Medicine alumni
People from Oxford County, Ontario
Physicians from British Columbia
Union Army surgeons